WUPT (100.3 FM, "100.3 The Point") is a radio station broadcasting a classic hits music format. Licensed to Gwinn, Michigan, United States, the station is currently owned by Armada Media Corporation, through licensee AMC Partners Escanaba, LLC.

History
The Federal Communications Commission issued a construction permit for the station on June 9, 2005. The station was assigned the call sign WUPF on September 29, 2006, and received its license to cover on July 29, 2008. On August 7, 2008, the station changed its call sign to the current WUPT., WUPT is now part of the Radio Results Network owned by Armada Media Partners Escanaba Michigan

Currently, WUPT airs a Classic Hits music format and is the Flagship station for Northern Michigan University Sports.

References

The Point airs a Classic Hits format and NMU sports,along with Totally 80s Flashback.

External links

UPT
Classic hits radio stations in the United States
Radio stations established in 2008